Osman II was the Sultan of Maldives from 1420 to 1421. He was the son of Sultan Hassan I and also brother of Sultan Ibrahim I. Sultan Osman was famous for his kindness to his subjects.

15th-century sultans of the Maldives
Year of birth unknown
Year of death unknown